Barbara F. Walter is an American political scientist who is the Rohr Professor of International affairs at the School of Global Policy and Strategy at the University of California, San Diego. She is known for her work on bargaining theory and political violence, especially the outbreak and resolution of civil war, and the logic of terrorist violence. Since 2012, she has been a permanent member of the Council on Foreign Relations.

Education 
Walter earned her B.A. in political science and German from Bucknell University, and her M.A. and Ph.D. in political science, both from the University of Chicago. She completed post-doctoral fellowships at the Olin Institute for Strategic Studies at Harvard University, and at the War and Peace Institute at Columbia University.

Career 
Walter is the Rohr Professor of International affairs at the School of Global Policy and Strategy at the University of California, San Diego. She joined UCSD's faculty in 1996 and was the Associate Dean from 2012 to 2014 and 2017. In 2012, Walter co-founded (with Erica Chenoweth) the blog Political Violence @ a Glance, winner of the International Studies Association’s Most Promising Blog of the Year in 2013, Best Group Blog of the Year in 2014 and 2018, and Best Blog Post of the Year in 2013, 2014, and 2015.

Walter is on the editorial boards of the International Organization and Journal of Conflict Resolution. She is the recipient of awards and grants from the Smith Richardson Foundation, Carnegie Corporation of New York, National Science Foundation, the World Bank, and The Harry Frank Guggenheim Foundation.

In a March 2022 Washington Post interview, Walter drew parallels between historical civil wars and insurgencies with the present political environment in the United States. She asserted, "There are definitely lots of groups on the far right who want war. They are preparing for war. And not talking about it does not make us safer," adding that citizens of other countries who experienced civil wars "were surprised in part because they didn’t know what the warning signs were."

Awards 
National Peacemaker Award. National Conflict Resolution Center 
New York Times Bestseller list.How Civil Wars Start and How To Stop Them
Susan Strange Award.
UC San Diego Faculty Research Award
Council on Foreign Relations, Life Member 
UCSD Distinguished Teaching Award

Selected bibliography 

Kahler, Miles, and Barbara Walter, editors. Territoriality and Conflict in an Era of Globalization. Cambridge University Press, 2006, Cambridge University Press

Walter, Barbara F. “Why Bad Governance Leads to Repeat Civil War.” The Journal of Conflict Resolution, vol. 59, no. 7, 2015, pp. 1242–72. JSTOR*

Walter, Barbara F. “The Critical Barrier to Civil War Settlement.” International Organization, vol. 51, no. 3, 1997, pp. 335–364.,

References

External links
 Dr. Walter's Blog, Political Violence @ a Glance
 Dr. Walter on the Citation of Women in Political Science
 Dr. Walter on the Gender Gap in Scholarship
  Dr. Walter in The Nation on Syria
  Dr. Walter's profile at UCSD

21st-century American women
American political scientists
American women political scientists
Bucknell University alumni
Living people
People from Bronxville, New York
University of California, San Diego faculty
University of Chicago alumni
Writers from New York (state)
Year of birth missing (living people)